Noriyasu (written: , , ,  or ) is a masculine Japanese given name. Notable people with the name include:

, Japanese composer
, Japanese AIDS activist
, Japanese badminton player
, Japanese long-distance runner
, Japanese motorcycle racer

Japanese masculine given names